{{DISPLAYTITLE:C23H30O6}}
The molecular formula C23H30O6 may refer to:

 Cortisone acetate, a synthetic glucocorticoid corticosteroid and corticosteroid ester which is marketed in many countries throughout the world
 Prednisolone acetate, a synthetic glucocorticoid corticosteroid and a corticosteroid ester, the 21-acetate ester of prednisolone
 Citreoviridin, a mycotoxin